Richard Twiss (June 11, 1954 – February 9, 2013) was a Native American educator and author. He was a member of the Sicangu Lakota Oyate. He was the Co-Founder and President of Wiconi International.

His vision was, "Serve as a bridge builder and consultant, nationally and internationally, to develop understanding, respect and mutual appreciation for one another, especially among Native American/First Nations people."

Biography 
Richard's father, Franklin "Buster" Twiss (May 7, 1927– August 17, 1999) was an enrolled member of the Pine Ridge Oglala Lakota tribe in South Dakota and was a SFC Army veteran. His mother, Winona LaPointe is from the Sicangu Lakota from the Rosebud Indian Reservation in Norris, South Dakota, and she attended the St. Francis Indian Mission School as a young girl through high school graduation.

In 1972, Richard Twiss was a participant in the forced occupation of the Bureau of Indian Affairs Building in Washington, D.C., with the radical political group, the American Indian Movement. Twiss later became a Christian minister, author, and public speaker. He married his wife Katherine in 1976 and had four grown sons, residing in Vancouver, Washington since 1981.

Richard Twiss was a founding board member of NAIITS, an Indigenous Learning Community. www.naiits.com

Twiss was a Board Member of the Christian Community Development Association, founded by John M. Perkins in 1989.

In 2011, he earned a doctorate in Inter-Cultural Studies (cultural anthropology, primal and folk religions and the history of Christian mission) from Asbury Theological Seminary. 

On February 6, 2013, Twiss suffered a major heart attack in Washington, D.C. He died on February 9, with his wife and sons at his side. His interment was next to his father at Black Hills National Cemetery.

Works 

 Dancing Our Prayers
 Culture, Christ, & Kingdom Study Guide

References

External links 
 Wiconi International
 NAIITS An Indigenous Learning Community (formerly the North American Institute for Indigenous Theological Studies)

1954 births
2013 deaths
Brulé people
Native American writers
People from Rosebud Indian Reservation, South Dakota
Religious figures of the indigenous peoples of North America
Writers from Vancouver, Washington